A Dash of Courage is a 1916 American silent comedy film directed by Charley Chase, starring Gloria Swanson, and featuring Wallace Beery, to whom she was briefly married.

Synopsis

Cast
 Harry Gribbon as Police Commissioner
 Guy Woodward
 Gloria Swanson
 Bobby Vernon
 Frank Opperman (actor)
 Wallace Beery as Police chief
 Hank Mann
 Nick Cogley
 Billy Mason (as William Mason)
 Al Kaufman
 Jack Mintz
 William Jefferson (actor)
 Joan Havez
 Charley Chase
 Raymond Griffith as Policeman (as Ray Griffith)
 Jack Henderson

Reviews
Louis Reeves Harrison's review in The Moving Picture World (1916) said that Harry Gribbon's performance offered "much that is new in characterization and in his personality, and his support is active enough to make the little play move with snap from start to finish". Thomas C. Kennedy said in his review for Motography (1916) that "one finds many really humorous moments, and the picture tells a story that is always interesting; in fact, a story with such continuity as this one has is quite unusual in farce of the Keystone type". Kennedy praised the actor's performances, highlighting Gribbon's leading role saying, he "wins the acting honors".

References

External links

1916 films
1916 comedy films
1916 short films
American silent short films
American black-and-white films
Silent American comedy films
Films directed by Charley Chase
Films produced by Mack Sennett
Keystone Studios films
1910s American films